Alcyopis is a genus of beetles in the family Cerambycidae, containing the following species:

 Alcyopis chalcea Bates, 1874
 Alcyopis cyanoptera Pascoe, 1866
 Alcyopis nigromaculata Aurivillius, 1927
 Alcyopis nigrovittata Gounelle, 1909

References

Ibidionini